Mohammed Bilal is a former Bahrainian international football player who played for Bahrain in the 1985 Arab Cup.

References

Bahraini footballers
Bahrain international footballers
Year of birth missing (living people)
Living people
Place of birth missing (living people)
Association footballers not categorized by position